Quabbin may refer to:
 Quabbin Aqueduct
 Quabbin Reservoir
 Quabbin Valley
 Greenwich, Massachusetts first organized as Quabbin in 1739 and Quabbin Parrish in 1754.